Château Rouge (Red Castle) is a château in the ancienne commune of Bas-Oha, Wanze, Liège Province, Wallonia, Belgium.

The original castle was built in the 11th century, and served as the residence for a religious community. Gutted by a fire in 1885, the current structure was built within the original walls, though the red colour may be an addition to these outer walls during this 19th century rebuild.

Château Rouge, now abandoned, was last used as a nursing home.

See also
List of castles in Belgium
 urban exploration photography of Chateau Rouge

References

External links
2015 YouTube video of Château Rouge, abandoned but with some "modern" furniture and infrastructure still in place

Castles in Belgium
Castles in Liège Province